Riin Emajõe (born 29 March 1993) is an Estonian football player who plays as a defender. She has made a total of 23 appearances for the Estonia women's national football team.

Her older sister Liis Emajõe is also a football player.

References

External links

1993 births
Living people
Estonian women's footballers
Estonia women's international footballers
Maine Black Bears women's soccer players
People from Põltsamaa
Women's association football defenders
FC Flora (women) players
Estonian expatriate sportspeople in the United States
Expatriate women's soccer players in the United States
Estonian expatriate footballers